Belle Yang (born 1960) is an artist, author, graphic novelist and children's book writer.

Biography
Yang was born in Taiwan in 1960, and moved to the San Francisco Bay area with her parents when she was seven years old. She graduated from University of California, Santa Cruz with a degree in biology, then enrolled in art school. When an ex-boyfriend began harassing Yang, her parents sent her to live with friends of the family in Beijing. She spent three years in China, traveling the country and studying history and classical Chinese art. She was in Beijing during the 1989 Tiananmen Square protests, and returned to the US later that year. Once home, she started recording her parents' stories of their life in China, and that led to her first book, Baba, A Return to China Upon My Father's Shoulders, in 1994. The book, published by Harcourt Brace, was about her father, Joseph Yang, walking out of a 1940s war-torn China.

Author Amy Tan, who wrote the foreword to Baba, says that "Belle Yang is an American writer who writes in English and thinks in Chinese". Maxine Hong Kingston compared Yang's art and writing to that of Isaac Bashevis Singer and Marc Chagall. The Kirkus Review wrote that "Yang's work is like a lovely painted scroll swimming with wild souls, beasts, birds, flowers, day and night sky, tragedy, and hope".

In 1996, Yang wrote a second book about her father's exodus from China, Odyssey of a Manchurian. She completed the trilogy, in 2010, with publication by W.W. Norton and Company of the graphic novel Forget Sorrow, An Ancestral Tale.

Yang has also written children's books including Chili-Chili-Chin-Chin, Foo the Flying Frog of Washtub Pond, Always Come Home to Me and My Name Is Hannah, a retelling of her family waiting for its green card after entering the United States.

Yang has had numerous museum exhibitions, including a national tour in its third year, Crossing Cultures: Belle Yang, A Story of Immigration. She is the subject of a film documentary by Mac and Ava Motion Pictures that has been telecast on public television, My Name Is Belle.

Selected works

References

1965 births
Living people
American writers of Taiwanese descent
American women writers of Chinese descent
American women artists
21st-century American women writers
Taiwanese emigrants to the United States
University of California, Santa Cruz alumni
Female comics writers
American female comics artists
Taiwanese women artists
21st-century Taiwanese women writers
Taiwanese female comics artists
American children's writers
Taiwanese children's writers